The following lists events that happened during 1856 in New Zealand.

After several previous attempts, New Zealand finally achieves "Responsible Government", with a majority of the members of the House of Representatives supporting the Government.

Population
The estimated population of New Zealand at the end of 1856 is 58,300 Māori and 45,540 non-Māori. The total population reaches the 100,000 mark during the year.

Incumbents

Regal and viceregal
Head of State – Queen Victoria
Governor – Colonel Thomas Gore Browne

Government and law
The 2nd Parliament is formed on 15 April. The election of its members had in fact concluded on 28 December the previous year.

Speaker of the House – Sir Charles Clifford
Colonial Secretary – Henry Sewell becomes New Zealand's first Colonial Secretary on 7 May. The Sewell Ministry is defeated on 20 May and he is replaced by William Fox. The Fox Ministry is in turn defeated on 2 June and Fox is replaced by Edward Stafford's Stafford Ministry.
Colonial Treasurer – Dillon Bell becomes the first Colonial Treasurer on 7 May. When the Sewell government is defeated on 20 May he is replaced by Charles Brown. When the Fox government is defeated on 2 June Brown is replaced by William Richmond
Chief Justice – William Martin

Events 
31 July – By Royal Charter, Christchurch is proclaimed New Zealand's first city.
18 September – The Wanganui Chronicle publishes its first issue. The paper starts as a fortnightly publication, moves to tri-weekly in 1867, and then to daily in 1871. It continues .
11 December – The Auckland Examiner begins publishing. It continues until 1861.
26 December – The Otago Colonist publishes its first issue. The newspaper changes its name to The Colonist in 1862 and is absorbed into the Daily Telegraph at the beginning of 1863.

Arts and literature

Music
A choral society performance of Handel's Messiah is given in Auckland. This the first known performance by such a musical ensemble in New Zealand.
A Harmonic Society is formed in Dunedin in this year (or possibly earlier).

Births
 28 July: Arthur Remington, politician.
 10 October: Florence Young, missionary.
 27 December: Arthur Brown, Mayor of Wellington.

Deaths

 13 April: Nōpera Panakareao, tribal leader, evangelist and assessor

Unknown date
 Te Kani-a-Takirau, Māori chief who refused to sign the Treaty of Waitangi

See also
List of years in New Zealand
Timeline of New Zealand history
History of New Zealand
Military history of New Zealand
Timeline of the New Zealand environment
Timeline of New Zealand's links with Antarctica

References

External links